{{DISPLAYTITLE:C13H16N2O2}}
The molecular formula C13H16N2O2 (molar mass : 232.27 g/mol, exact mass : 232.121178) may refer to:

 Aminoglutethimide
 Horsfiline
 5,6-MDO-DMT
 Melatonin, a hormone
 Methylphenylpiracetam
 Mofebutazone